Detlef Wiedeke (born 5 July 1950) is a German singer, songwriter, and record producer.

Between 1984 and 2000, Wiedeke collaborated with Dieter Bohlen for which he sang in the Modern Talking and Blue System choruses. Since 2003, he has worked on his music group Systems in Blue.

His voice type is bass, falsetto.

See also 
 Rolf Köhler
 Michael Scholz

References

External links 
 
 http://www.vintage-music.de/ Vintage Music (his recording studio)
 http://www.systems-in-blue.de Systems in Blue official site

1950 births
Living people
German male musicians
German male singers
German pop singers
German record producers
German session musicians
German songwriters
Modern Talking